Galinsoga is a genus of flowering plants in the family Asteraceae. It is native to North and South America and the West Indies, and naturalized in Europe, Asia, Africa, and Australia.

The name Galinsoga was dedicated to Ignacio Mariano Martinez de Galinsoga, who founded the Spanish Real Academia Nacional de Medicina and was director of the Real Jardín Botánico de Madrid.

 Species

References

 United States Department of Agriculture plants profile

 
Asteraceae genera